Sara Guido (born 23 September 1963) is a Mexican swimmer. She competed in three events at the 1984 Summer Olympics.

References

1963 births
Living people
Mexican female swimmers
Olympic swimmers of Mexico
Swimmers at the 1984 Summer Olympics
Place of birth missing (living people)
20th-century Mexican women